There Are Eight Million Stories... is the debut album by The June Brides. It was released in September 1985 on the Pink Label.

Track listing

"The Instrumental" (3:18)
"I Fall" (2:27)
"Sunday To Saturday" (3:11)
"Sick, Tired And Drunk" (2:01)
"Every Conversation" (3:09)
"Comfort" (2:19)
"Heard You Whisper" (3:05)
"Enemies" (3:04) (cover of The Radiators from Space)

References

1985 albums
The June Brides albums